Donald Martin (1873–1938) was a Scottish Roman Catholic clergyman who served as the Bishop of Argyll and the Isles from 1919 to 1938.

Born in Salen on the Ardnamurchan peninsula, Scotland on 6 October 1873. He studied at the Royal Scots College, Valladolid from 1899 to 1905 where his uncle, David McDonald, was rector. He was ordained to the priesthood on 23 September 1905. He served as parish priest in Castlebay 1906-1908, curate in Glencoe 1908-1909 and parish priest of Oban 1909-1919.

He was appointed the Bishop of the Diocese of Argyll and the Isles by the Holy See on 2 April 1919, and consecrated to the Episcopate on 11 June 1919 at Oban. The principal consecrator was John Toner, Bishop of Dunkeld, and the principal co-consecrators were James William McCarthy, Bishop of Galloway and Henry Gray Graham, Auxiliary Bishop of St Andrews and Edinburgh.

He died in office on 6 December 1938, aged 65.

References 

1873 births
1938 deaths
Roman Catholic bishops of Argyll and the Isles